Martín Exequiel Ojeda (born 27 November 1998) is an Argentine professional footballer who plays as a winger for Major League Soccer club Orlando City SC.

Career 
Ojeda began his senior career with Ferro Carril Oeste of Primera B Nacional. His debut appearance for the club arrived on 30 January 2016 against Atlético Paraná, playing eighty-five minutes and scoring Ferro Carril Oeste's only goal in a 1–1 draw. He scored two more goals in twenty further appearances during 2016. After twenty-four appearances and two goals in his second campaign, Ojeda departed in July 2017 to join Primera División side Racing Club. He made his first top-flight appearance on 17 September versus Banfield, which was one of sixteen matches in his opening season as they finished in seventh place.

After appearing just twice in 2018–19, in the Copa Sudamericana against Corinthians on both occasions, Ojeda left on loan in July 2019 to fellow Primera División team Huracán. He made a total of twelve appearances, scoring in his final league match on 7 March 2020 against Banfield.

On 7 January 2023, Ojeda signed a three-year designated player contract with an additional two option years with Orlando City of Major League Soccer.

Career statistics 
.

References

External links 
 

1998 births
Living people
Sportspeople from Entre Ríos Province
Argentine footballers
Association football midfielders
Primera Nacional players
Argentine Primera División players
Ferro Carril Oeste footballers
Racing Club de Avellaneda footballers
Club Atlético Huracán footballers
Godoy Cruz Antonio Tomba footballers
Orlando City SC players
Designated Players (MLS)
Major League Soccer players